The Dassault Rafale (literally meaning "gust of wind", and "burst of fire" in a more military sense) is a French twin-engine, canard delta wing, multirole fighter aircraft designed and built by Dassault Aviation. Equipped with a wide range of weapons, the Rafale is intended to perform air supremacy, interdiction, aerial reconnaissance, ground support, in-depth strike, anti-ship strike and nuclear deterrence missions. The Rafale is referred to as an "omnirole" aircraft by Dassault.

In the late 1970s, the French Air Force and French Navy were seeking to replace and consolidate their existing fleets of aircraft. In order to reduce development costs and boost prospective sales, France entered into an arrangement with the UK, Germany, Italy and Spain to produce an agile multi-purpose "Future European Fighter Aircraft" (which would become the Eurofighter Typhoon). Subsequent disagreements over workshare and differing requirements led to France's pursuit of its own development programme. Dassault built a technology demonstrator which first flew in July 1986 as part of an eight-year flight-test programme, paving the way for the go-ahead of the project. The Rafale is distinct from other European fighters of its era in that it is almost entirely built by one country, involving most of France's major defence contractors, such as Dassault, Thales and Safran.

Many of the aircraft's avionics and features, such as direct voice input, the RBE2 AA active electronically scanned array (AESA) radar and the optronique secteur frontal infra-red search and track (IRST) sensor, were domestically developed and produced for the Rafale programme. Originally scheduled to enter service in 1996, the Rafale suffered significant delays due to post-Cold War budget cuts and changes in priorities. The aircraft is available in three main variants: Rafale C single-seat land-based version, Rafale B twin-seat land-based version, and Rafale M single-seat carrier-based version.

Introduced in 2001, the Rafale is being produced for both the French Air Force and for carrier-based operations in the French Navy. The Rafale has been marketed for export to several countries, and was selected for purchase by the Egyptian Air Force, the Indian Air Force, the Qatar Air Force, the Hellenic Air Force, the Croatian Air Force, the Indonesian Air Force and the United Arab Emirates Air Force. The Rafale has been used in combat over Afghanistan, Libya, Mali, Iraq and Syria.

Development

Origins
In the mid-1970s, both the French Air Force (Armée de l'Air) and Navy (Marine Nationale) had requirements for a new generation of fighters to replace those in or about to enter service. Because their requirements were similar, and to reduce cost, both departments issued a common request for proposal. In 1975, the French Ministry of Aviation initiated studies for a new aircraft to complement the upcoming and smaller Dassault Mirage 2000, with each aircraft optimised for differing roles.

In 1979, the French company Dassault joined the MBB/BAe "European Collaborative Fighter" project which was renamed the "European Combat Aircraft" (ECA). The French company contributed the aerodynamic layout of a prospective twin-engine, single-seat fighter; however, the project collapsed in 1981 due to differing operational requirements of each partner country. In 1983, the "Future European Fighter Aircraft" (FEFA) programme was initiated, bringing together Italy, Spain, West Germany, France and the United Kingdom to jointly develop a new fighter, although the latter three had their own aircraft developments.

A number of factors led to the eventual split between France and the other four countries. Around 1984 France reiterated its requirement for a carrier-capable version and demanded a leading role. It also insisted on a swing-role fighter that was lighter than the design favoured by the other four nations. West Germany, the UK and Italy opted out and established a new European Fighter Aircraft (EFA) programme. In Turin on 2 August 1985, West Germany, the UK and Italy agreed to go ahead with the EFA, and confirmed that France, along with Spain, had chosen not to proceed as a member of the project. Despite pressure from France, Spain rejoined the Eurofighter project in early September 1985. The four-nation project eventually resulted in the Eurofighter Typhoon's development.

Design phase and prototype
In France, the government proceeded with its own programme. The French Ministry of Defence required an aircraft capable of air-to-air and air-to-ground, all-day and adverse weather operations. Unlike other contemporary European fighter projects that required some level of international collaboration and cost-sharing, France was the sole developer of the Rafale's airframe, avionics, propulsion system and armament, and as such the aircraft was to replace a multitude of aircraft in the French Armed Forces.  The Rafale would perform roles previously filled by an assortment of specialised platforms, including the Jaguar, Mirage F1C/CR/CT, Mirage 2000C/-5/N in the French Air Force, and the F-8P Crusader, Étendard IVP/M and Super Étendard in French Naval Aviation.

During October–December 1978, prior to France's joining of the ECA, Dassault received contracts for the development of project ACT 92 (Avion de Combat Tactique, meaning "Tactical Combat Airplane"). The following year, the National Office for Aviation Studies and Research began studying the possible configurations of the new fighter under the codename Rapace (meaning "Bird of Prey"). By March 1980, the number of configurations had been narrowed down to four, two of which had a combination of canards, delta wings and a single vertical tail-fin. In October 1982, the French Ministry of Defence announced that Dassault would build a technology demonstrator named Avion de Combat expérimental (Experimental Combat Airplane, ACX). France wanted to collaborate with West Germany and the UK on the project, but was prepared to build the ACX by itself. In 1984, the government decided to proceed with a combat variant of the ACX due to the conflicting technical criteria of the respective FEFA participant nations.

The resultant Rafale A technology demonstrator was a large-delta winged fighter, with all-moving canards, embodying fly-by-wire (FBW) flight control system. Construction of the demonstrator commenced in March 1984, even before a contract was signed with the DGA, France's defence procurement agency. The technology demonstrator was rolled out in December 1985 in Saint-Cloud, and took its maiden flight on 4 July 1986 from Istres-Le Tubé Air Base in southern France. The  demonstrator stopped in  upon landing.

The demonstrator was initially powered by General Electric F404-GE-400 afterburning turbofans from the F/A-18 Hornet, instead of the Snecma M88, to reduce the risk that often comes with a first flight, and since the M88 was not considered sufficiently mature for the initial trials programme. It was not until May 1990 when the M88 replaced the port F404 in the demonstrator to enable the aircraft to reach Mach 1.4 and demonstrate supercruise, or sustained supersonic flight without use of afterburners. After 865 flights with four pilots, Rafale A was retired in January 1994.

At the time of the Rafale A's maiden flight, France entered unsuccessful talks with Belgium, Denmark, the Netherlands and Norway about a possible collaboration on the Rafale as a multinational project; at the time, Belgium was reportedly interested in the Rafale B. In June 1987, Prime Minister Jacques Chirac declared that the country would proceed with the US$30 billion project. Subsequently, on 21 April 1988, the French government awarded Dassault a contract for four Rafale prototypes: one Rafale C, two Rafale Ms and one Rafale B. The first out of an expected 330 Rafales was scheduled to enter service in 1996. However, the fall of the Berlin Wall, which signalled the end of the Cold War, as well as the need to reduce the national deficit, compelled the French government to drastically reduce its defence budget; the 1994 budget for the Rafale programme was cut by US$340 million. This reduced the size of the Rafale orders, which Dassault and other companies involved claimed impeded production management and led to higher costs, and delayed the entry of the aircraft into service. The French Air Force was reorganised, the Mirage 5F was completely phased out and a total of 55 Mirage F1Cs were upgraded to a tactical fighter configuration, redesignated as Mirage F1CT. The budget cuts prolonged the Rafale's development considerably.

During the Rafale A flight test programme, the French government in 1989 looked at the F/A-18 Hornet as a potential replacement for the rapidly aging F-8 Crusader, which had been serving since the 1950s. The French Navy entered purchase of second-hand F/A-18s with Australia, Canada and the US, after the decision was made not to upgrade the Crusaders. The US Navy agreed to supply two F/A-18s to the French Navy for "interoperability testing" aboard the French aircraft carrier Foch. The French government did not proceed with a purchase of the twin-engine fighter.

Testing

To meet the various roles expected of the new aircraft, the Air Force required two variants: the single-seat "Rafale C" (chasseur, meaning "fighter" or literally "hunter") and the "Rafale B" (biplace, or two-seater). The prototype of the C model (designated C01) completed its first flight on 19 May 1991, signalling the start of a test programme which primarily aimed to test the M88-2 engines, man-machine interface and weapons, and expand the flight envelope. Due to budget constraints, the second single-seat prototype was never built.

The C01 differed significantly from the Rafale A. Although superficially identical to the technology demonstrator, it was smaller and more stealthy due to the gold-coated canopy, a re-design of the fuselage-fin joint, and the addition of radar-absorbent materials (RAM). This aircraft also saw extensive application of composite and other materials, which both reduced the radar cross-section (RCS) and weight. Moreover, Dassault opted to reject variable engine inlets and a dedicated air brake, which lessens maintenance loads and saves weight. The B01, the only prototype of the two-seat B variant, made its maiden flight on 30 April 1993. It was  heavier than the single-seater, but carried  less fuel. The aircraft was used for weapon-systems testing. Later it was tasked with validating weapon separation and, specifically, the carriage of heavy loads. The aircraft's typical loadout consisted of two  external tanks, two Apache/Scalp cruise missiles, in addition to four air-to-air missiles.

The Navy, meanwhile, sought a carrier-based aircraft to supersede its fleet of ageing Étendard IV Ms & Ps, F-8P Crusaders and Super Étendard Modernisés. While the Navy initially modernised the Crusaders, in the long-term, the requirement was met with the navalised Rafale M. The M01, the naval prototype, first flew on 12 December 1991, followed by the second on 8 November 1993. Since France had no land-based catapult test facility, catapult trials were initially carried out between during July–August 1992 and early the following year, at NAS Lakehurst in New Jersey. The aircraft then carried out trials aboard the carrier Foch in April 1993. Flown by Dassault's chief test pilot, Yves Kerhervé, M02 made its maiden flight in November that year, while the first prototype completed the third round of testing at Lakehurst in November and December 1993.

Production and upgrades
Initially, the Rafale B was to be just a trainer, but the Gulf War showed that a second crew member was invaluable on strike and reconnaissance missions. Therefore, in 1991 the Air Force switched its preferences towards the two-seater, announcing that the variant would constitute 60 percent of the Rafale fleet. The service originally envisaged taking delivery of 250 Rafales, but this was initially revised downwards to 234 aircraft, made up of 95 "A" and 139 "B" models", and later to 212 aircraft. The Navy, meanwhile, had 60 Rafales on order, down from 86 due to budget cuts. Of the 60, 25 would be M single-seaters and 35 two-seat Ns, though the two-seater was later cancelled.

Production of the first aircraft series formally started in December 1992, but was suspended in November 1995 due to political and economic uncertainty. Production only resumed in January 1997 after the Ministry of Defence and Dassault agreed on a 48-aircraft (28 firm and 20 options) production run with delivery between 2002 and 2007. A further order of 59 F3 Rafales was announced in December 2004. In November 2009 the French government ordered an additional 60 aircraft to take the total order for the French Air Force and Navy to 180.

During the Rafale's design phase, Dassault took advantage of Dassault Systèmes' CATIA (Computer Aided Three-dimensional Interactive Application), a three-dimensional computer-aided design, manufacture and engineering software suite that would become standard across the industry. CATIA enabled digitisation and efficiency improvements throughout the Rafale programme, as it implemented recently developed processes such as digital mockup and product data management. It consisted of 15 GB databases of each of the Rafale's components, assisting with various aspects of the design, manufacture and through-life support.

According to the French magazine L'Usine nouvelle, apart from several non-sensitive components sourced from the United States, the Rafale is manufactured almost entirely in France. Different elements are produced in numerous factories across the country, and final assembly takes place near Bordeaux–Mérignac Airport. For example, the flight control surfaces are fabricated in Haute-Savoie, the wings and avionics in Gironde, the centre fuselage in Val-d'Oise, and the engines in Essonne. Roughly 50 percent of the Rafale is produced by Dassault and the other half divided between two major partners, Thales and Safran, who rely on a network of 500 subcontractors. Altogether, the programme employs 7,000 workers. , the fabrication process of each fighter took 24 months, with an annual production rate of eleven aircraft.

Deliveries of the Rafale's naval version were a high priority to replace the Navy's considerably aged F-8 Crusaders, and so the first production model for the French Navy undertook its first flight on 7 July 1999. Their first naval deployment was in 2002 on board Charles de Gaulle; by March 2002, the aircraft carrier was stationed in the Gulf of Oman, where its complement of Rafales undertook training operations. In December 2004, the Air Force received its first three F2 standard Rafale Bs at the Centre d'Expériences Aériennes Militaires (CEAM, i.e. the Military Air Experiment Centre) at Mont-de-Marsan, where they were tasked to undertake operational evaluation and pilot conversion training.

The total programme cost, as of FY2013, was around €45.9 billion, which translated to a unit programme cost of approximately €160.5 million. This figure takes in account improved hardware of the F3 standard, and which includes development costs over a period of 40 years, including inflation. The unit flyaway price  was €101.1 million for the F3+ version.

In 2008, French officials were reportedly considering equipping the Rafale to launch miniaturised satellites. In 2011, upgrades under consideration included a software radio and satellite link, a new laser-targeting pod, smaller bombs and enhancements to the aircraft's data-fusion capacity. In July 2012, fleetwide upgrades of the Rafale's battlefield communications and interoperability capabilities commenced.

In January 2014, Defence Minister Jean-Yves Le Drian announced that €1 billion is allocated towards the development of the F3R standard. The standard will see the integration of the Meteor BVR missile, among other weapons and software updates. The standard was to be validated by 2018.

From 26 to 29 April 2021, a first test campaign was carried out by aircraft configured with the new F4-1 standard.

The Rafale is planned to be the French Air Force's primary combat aircraft until 2040 or later, until replacement by the Franco-German New Generation Fighter.

Future replacement
In 2018, Dassault announced the successor to the Rafale as the New Generation Fighter. This fighter aircraft under development by Dassault Aviation and Airbus Defence and Space, is to replace France's Rafale, Germany's Eurofighter Typhoon, and Spain's F/A-18 Hornet in the 2030–2040 timeframe.

Design

Overview
The Rafale was developed as a modern jet fighter with a very high level of agility; Dassault chose to combine a delta wing with active close-coupled canard to maximize manoeuvrability. The aircraft is capable of withstanding from −3.6g to 9g (10.5g on Rafale solo display and a maximum of 11g can be reached in case of emergency). The Rafale is an aerodynamically unstable aircraft and uses digital fly-by-wire flight controls to artificially enforce and maintain stability. According to simulations by Dassault, the Rafale has sufficient low speed performance to operate from STOBAR-configured aircraft carriers, and can take off using a ski-jump with no modifications.

The Rafale M features a greatly reinforced undercarriage to cope with the additional stresses of naval landings, an arrestor hook, and "jump strut" nosewheel, which only extends during short takeoffs, including catapult launches. It also features a built-in ladder, carrier-based microwave landing system, and the new fin-tip Telemir system for syncing the inertial navigation system to external equipment. Altogether, the naval modifications of the Rafale M increase its weight by  compared to other variants. The Rafale M retains about 95 percent commonality with Air Force variants including, although unusual for carrier-based aircraft, being unable to fold its multi-spar wings to reduce storage space.

Radar signature

Although not a full-aspect stealth aircraft, the cost of which was viewed as unacceptably excessive, the Rafale was designed for a reduced radar cross-section (RCS) and infrared signature . In order to reduce the RCS, changes from the initial technology demonstrator include a reduction in the size of the tail-fin, fuselage reshaping, repositioning of the engine air inlets underneath the aircraft's wing, and the extensive use of composite materials and serrated patterns for the construction of the trailing edges of the wings and canards. Seventy percent of the Rafale's surface area is composite. Many of the features designed to reduce the Rafale's visibility to threats remain classified.

Cockpit
The Rafale's glass cockpit was designed around the principle of data fusion—a central computer selects and prioritises information to display to pilots for simpler command and control. The primary flight controls are arranged in a hands-on-throttle-and-stick (HOTAS)-compatible configuration, with a right-handed side-stick controller and a left-handed throttle. The seat is inclined rearwards at an angle of 29° to improve g-force tolerance during manoeuvring and to provide a less restricted external pilot view. An intelligent flight suit worn by the pilot is automatically controlled by the aircraft to counteract in response to calculated g-forces.

Great emphasis has been placed on pilot workload minimisation across all operations. Among the features of the highly digitised cockpit is an integrated direct voice input (DVI) system, allowing a range of aircraft functions to be controlled by spoken voice commands, simplifying the pilot's access to many of the controls. Developed by Crouzet, the DVI is capable of managing radio communications and countermeasures systems, the selection of armament and radar modes, and controlling navigational functions. For safety reasons, DVI is deliberately not employed for safety-critical elements of the aircraft's operation, such as the final release of weapons.

For displaying information gathered from a range of sensors across the aircraft, the cockpit features a wide-angle holographic head-up display (HUD) system, two head-down flat-panel colour multi-function displays (MFDs) as well as a central collimated display. These displays have been strategically placed to minimise pilot distraction from the external environment. Some displays feature a touch interface for ease of human–computer interaction (HCI). A head-mounted display (HMD) remains to be integrated to take full advantage of its MICA missiles. The cockpit is fully compatible with night vision goggles (NVG).

In the area of life support, the Rafale is fitted with a Martin-Baker Mark 16F "zero-zero" ejection seat, capable of operation at zero speed and zero altitude. An on-board oxygen generating system, developed by Air Liquide, eliminates the need to carry bulky oxygen canisters. The Rafale's flight computer has been programmed to counteract pilot disorientation and to employ automatic recovery of the aircraft during negative flight conditions. The auto-pilot and autothrottle controls are also integrated, and are activated by switches located on the primary flight controls.

Avionics and equipment
The Rafale core avionics systems employ an integrated modular avionics (IMA), called MDPU (modular data processing unit). This architecture hosts all the main aircraft functions such as the flight management system, data fusion, fire control, and the man-machine interface. The total value of the radar, electronic communications and self-protection equipment is about 30 percent of the cost of the entire aircraft. The IMA has since been installed upon several upgraded Mirage 2000 fighters, and incorporated into the civilian airliner, the Airbus A380. According to Dassault, the IMA greatly assists combat operations via data fusion, the continuous integration and analysis of the various sensor systems throughout the aircraft, and has been designed for the incorporation of new systems and avionics throughout the Rafale's service life.

The Rafale features an integrated defensive-aids system named SPECTRA, which protects the aircraft against airborne and ground threats, developed as a joint venture between Thales and MBDA. Various methods of detection, jamming, and decoying have been incorporated, and the system has been designed to be highly reprogrammable for addressing new threats and incorporating additional sub-systems in the future. Operations over Libya were greatly assisted by SPECTRA, allowing Rafales to perform missions independently from the support of dedicated Suppression of Enemy Air Defences (SEAD) platforms.

The Rafale's ground attack capability is heavily reliant upon sensory targeting pods, such as Thales Optronics's Reco New Generation/Areos reconnaissance pod and Damocles electro-optical/laser designation pod. Together, these systems provide targeting information, enable tactical reconnaissance missions, and are integrated with the Rafale's IMA architecture to provide analysed data feeds to friendly units and ground stations, as well as to the pilot. Damocles provides targeting information to the various armaments carried by the Rafale and is directly integrated with the Rafale's VHF/UHF secure radio to communicate target information with other aircraft. It also performs other key functions such as aerial optical surveillance and is integrated with the navigation system as a FLIR.

The Damocles designation pod was described as "lacking competitiveness" when compared to rivals such as the Sniper and LITENING pods; so work began on an upgraded pod, designated Damocles XF, with additional sensors and added ability to transmit live video feeds. A new Thales targeting pod, the Talios, was officially unveiled at the 2014 Farnborough Air Show and is expected to be integrated on the Rafale by 2018. Thales' Areos reconnaissance pod is an all-weather, night-and-day-capable reconnaissance system employed on the Rafale, and provides a significantly improved reconnaissance capability over preceding platforms. Areos has been designed to perform reconnaissance under various mission profiles and condition, using multiple day/night sensors and its own independent communications datalinks.

Radar and sensors

The Rafale was first outfitted with the Thales RBE2 passive electronically scanned multi-mode radar. Thales claims to have achieved increased levels of situational awareness as compared to earlier aircraft through the earlier detection and tracking of multiple air targets for close combat and long-range interception, as well as real-time generation of three-dimensional maps for terrain-following and the real-time generation of high resolution ground maps for navigation and targeting. In early 1994, it was reported that technical difficulties with the radar had delayed the Rafale's development by six months. In September 2006, Flight International reported the Rafale's unit cost had significantly increased due to additional development work to improve the RBE2's detection range.

The RBE2 AA active electronically scanned array (AESA) radar now replaces the previous passively scanned RBE2. The RBE2 AA is reported to deliver a greater detection range of 200 km, improved reliability and reduced maintenance demands over the preceding radar. A Rafale demonstrator began test flights in 2002 and has totaled 100 flight hours . By December 2009, production of the pre-series RBE2 AA radars was underway. In early October 2012, the first Rafale equipped with an RBE2 AA radar arrived at Mont-de-Marsan Air Base for operational service (the development was described by Thales and Dassault as "on time and on budget"). By early 2014, the first Air Force front-line squadron were supposed to receive Rafales equipped with the AESA radar, following the French Navy which was slated to receive AESA-equipped Rafales starting in 2013.

To enable the Rafale to perform in the air supremacy role, it includes several passive sensor systems. The front-sector electro-optical system or Optronique Secteur Frontal (OSF), developed by Thales, is completely integrated within the aircraft and can operate both in the visible and infrared wavelengths. The OSF enables the deployment of infrared missiles such as the MICA at beyond visual range distances; it can also be used for detecting and identifying airborne targets, as well as those on the ground and at sea. Dassault describes the OSF as being immune to jamming and capable of providing covert long-range surveillance. In 2012, an improved version of the OSF was deployed operationally.

Armament and standards
Initial deliveries of the Rafale M were to the F1 ("France 1") standard, which were equipped for the air-to-air interceptor combat duties, but lacked any armament for air-to-ground operations. The F1 standard became operational in 2004. Later deliveries were to the "F2" standard, which added the capability for conducting air-to-ground operations; the first F2 standard Rafale M was delivered to the French Navy in May 2006. Starting in 2008 onwards, Rafale deliveries have been to the nuclear-capable F3 standard that also added reconnaissance with the Areos reconnaissance pod, and it has been reported that all aircraft built to the earlier F1 and F2 standards are to be upgraded to become F3s.

F3 standard Rafales are capable of undertaking many different mission roles with a range of equipment, namely air defence/superiority missions with Mica IR and EM air-to-air missiles, and precision ground attacks typically using SCALP EG cruise missiles and AASM Hammer air-to-surface missiles. In addition, anti-shipping missions could be carried out using the AM39 Exocet sea skimming missile, while reconnaissance flights would use a combination of onboard and external pod-based sensor equipment. Furthermore, the aircraft could conduct nuclear strikes when armed with ASMP-A missiles. In 2010, France ordered 200 MBDA Meteor beyond-visual-range missiles which will greatly increase the distance at which the Rafale can engage aerial targets when the missile enters service.

The F4 standard program was launched on 20 March 2017 by the French ministry of defence.

For compatibility with armaments of varying types and origins, the Rafale's onboard store management system is compliant with MIL-STD-1760, an electrical interface between an aircraft and its carriage stores, thereby simplifying the incorporation of many of their existing weapons and equipment. The Rafale is typically outfitted with 14 hardpoints (only 13 on Rafale M version), five of which are suitable for heavy armament or equipment such as auxiliary fuel tanks, and has a maximum external load capacity of nine tons. In addition to the above equipment, the Rafale carries the 30 mm GIAT 30 revolver cannon and can be outfitted with a range of laser-guided bombs and ground-attack munitions. According to Dassault, the Rafale's onboard mission systems enable ground attack and air-to-air combat operations to be carried out within a single sortie, with many functions capable of simultaneous execution in conjunction with another, increasing survivability and versatility.

Engines

The engines feature several advances, including a non-polluting combustion chamber, single-crystal turbine blades, powder metallurgy disks, and technology to reduce radar and infrared signatures. The M88 enables the Rafale to supercruise while carrying four missiles and one drop tank.

Qualification of the M88-2 engine ended in 1996 and the first production engine was delivered by the end of the year. Due to delays in engine production, the Rafale A demonstrator was initially powered by the General Electric F404 engine. In May 2010, a Rafale flew for the first time with the M88-4E engine, an upgraded variant with lower maintenance requirements than the preceding M88-2. The engine is of a modular design for ease of construction and maintenance and to enable older engines to be retrofitted with improved subsections upon availability, such as existing M88-2s being upgraded to M88-4E standard. There has been interest in more powerful M88 engines by potential export customers, such as the United Arab Emirates (UAE). , a thrust vectoring variant of the engine designated as M88-3D was also under development.

Operational history

France

French Naval Aviation

In December 2000, the French Naval Aviation (Aéronavale), the air arm of the French Navy, received its first two Rafale M fighters. On 18 May the following year, the squadron Flottille 12F, which had previously operated the F-8 Crusader, became the first squadron to operate the Rafale after it was officially re-activated prior to the delivery of the sixth Rafale. Flottille 12F immediately participated in Trident d'Or aboard the aircraft carrier Charles de Gaulle with warships from ten other nations. During the maritime exercise, the Navy tested the Rafale's avionics during simulated interceptions with various foreign aircraft, in addition to carrier take-offs and landings. After almost four years of training, the Rafale M was declared operational with the French Navy in June 2004.

The Rafale M is fully compatible with US Navy aircraft carriers and some French Navy pilots have qualified to fly the aircraft from US Navy flight decks.

In 2002, the Rafales were first deployed to a combat zone; seven Rafale Ms embarked aboard Charles de Gaulle of the French Navy during "Mission Héraclès", the French participation in "Operation Enduring Freedom". They flew from the aircraft carrier over Afghanistan, but the F1 standard precluded air-to-ground missions and the Rafale did not see any action. In June 2002, while Charles de Gaulle was in the Arabian Sea, Rafales conducted several patrols near the India-Pakistan border.

In 2016, Rafales operating from Charles de Gaulle struck targets associated with the Islamic State of Iraq and the Levant.

In December 2015, American and French military officials reportedly discussed the possibility of French naval Rafale Ms flying combat missions from a US Navy  as soon as January 2017. This would enable continued French Navy operations against ISIL while Charles de Gaulle undergoes its year-and-a-half-long major refit, scheduled to begin in early 2017. Although Rafales have launched and landed on U.S. carriers to demonstrate interoperability, it would be the first time they would fly combat missions from one. As many as 18 Rafale Ms could be deployed on a carrier, although some room would have to be made for French Navy support crews familiar with maintaining the Rafale, as well as for spare parts and munitions. Operation Chesapeake, a test of this interoperability, was conducted in May 2018, when 12 Rafales of Flottilles 11F, 12F, and 17F, along with nearly 350 support personnel embarked aboard USS George H.W. Bush for two weeks of carrier qualifications and exercises after conducting a month of shore based training at Naval Air Station Oceana.

French Air and Space Force

Rafales were delivered to the French Air Force several years after the naval variant, initially with the Centre d'Expériences Aériennes Militaires (French Air Force Evaluation Centre) at Mont-de-Marsan Air Base in the trials and training role. By this time, it was expected that Escadron de Chasse (Fighter Squadron) 1/7 at Saint-Dizier would receive a nucleus of 8–10 Rafale F2s during the summer of 2006, in preparation for full operational service (with robust air-to-air and stand off air-to-ground precision attack capabilities) starting from mid-2007 (when EC 1/7 would have about 20 aircraft, 15 two-seaters and five single-seaters).

In 2007, a "crash program" upgrade on six Rafales enabled the use of laser-guided bombs in readiness for action in Afghanistan. Three of these aircraft of the Air Force were deployed to Dushanbe in Tajikistan, while the three others were Rafale Marine of the Navy on board Charles De Gaulle. The first mission occurred on 12 March 2007, and the first GBU-12 was launched on 28 March in support of embattled Dutch troops in Southern Afghanistan, marking the operational début of the Rafale. Between January 2009 and December 2011, a minimum of three Rafales were stationed at Kandahar International Airport to conduct operations in support of NATO ground forces.

On 19 March 2011, French Rafales began conducting reconnaissance and strike missions over Libya in Opération Harmattan, in support of United Nations Security Council Resolution 1973; initial targets were artillery pieces laying siege around the rebel city of Benghazi. The Rafale could operate in Libya without the support of SEAD aircraft, using the onboard SPECTRA self-defence system instead. On 24 March 2011, it was reported that a Rafale had destroyed a Libyan Air Force G-2/Galeb light attack/trainer aircraft on the runway. During the deployment, Rafale destroyed multiple SAM systems of Libyan military using its geolocation feature and with a mix of different ammunition. Unlike other allied aircraft, the Rafale did not require any dedicated EW/EA aircraft for escort.

Rafales typically conducted six-hour sorties over Libyan airspace, armed with four MICA air-to-air missiles, four or six AASM "Hammer" bombs, a Thales Damoclès targeting pod and two drop tanks. Each sortie needed multiple aerial refuelling operations from coalition tanker aircraft. Reportedly, Rafale crews preferred to use GPS-guided munitions with greater reliability and range. Storm Shadow SCALP weapons were deployed on only one or two sorties, such as against a Libyan airbase at Al-Jufra. In 2011, aviation journalist Craig Hoyle speculated that the Rafale's Libyan performance is likely to impact export sales, noting that the Rafale had maintained a high operational rate throughout. Hoyle also noted that the conflict had led to several urgent operational requirements, including a lighter ground-attack munition and AASM modifications for close air support.

In January 2013, the Rafale took part in "Opération Serval", the French military intervention in support to the government of Mali against the Movement for Oneness and Jihad in West Africa. The first mission was carried out on 13 January, when four Rafales took off from an airbase in France to strike rebel training camps, depots and facilities in the city of Gao in eastern Mali. Subsequent airstrikes in the following days by Rafale and Mirage fighters were reportedly instrumental in the withdrawal of Islamist militant forces from Timbuktu and Douentza. Both Rafale and Mirage 2000D aircraft used in the conflict have been based outside of North Africa, making use of aerial refuelling tanker aircraft to fly long range sorties across Algerian airspace and into Mali.

In August 2013, it was proposed that France may halve the number of Rafales to be delivered over the next six years for a total of 26 aircraft to be delivered during this period; foreign export procurements have been viewed as critical to maintain production under this proposal. While production would be slowed, France would still receive the same number of Rafales overall.

In September 2014, Rafales started reconnaissance missions over Iraq for Opération Chammal, France's contribution to the international effort to combat Islamic State (IS) militants. Six Rafales were initially tasked with identifying IS positions in support of US airstrikes, flying from Al Dhafra Air Base, UAE. On 18 September, Rafales joined American attack operations, launching four strikes near the Northern Iraqi town of Zummar that destroyed a logistics depot and killed dozens of IS fighters. In April 2018, during the Syrian Civil War, five Rafale Bs from the Escadron de Chasse 1/4 Gascogne participated in the 2018 missile strikes against Syria. Each was loaded with two SCALP EG missiles.

Egypt
In November 2014, Egypt was reportedly in negotiations with France to purchase 24 to 36 Rafales, subject to a financing agreement. By February 2015, the two countries were negotiating a loan from France's export credit agency to reach an export agreement for up to 24 Rafales. Egypt aimed for the deal's quick completion as to have them on display at the inauguration of the Suez Canal expansion in August 2015.

On 16 February 2015, Egypt became the Rafale's first international customer when it officially ordered 24 Rafales, as part of a larger deal, including a FREMM multipurpose frigate and missiles, worth US$5.9 billion (€5.2 billion). The order comprised 8 single-seat models and 16 two-seaters. In July 2015, a ceremony marking Egypt's acceptance of its first three Rafales, was held at Dassault's flight test center in Istres. In January 2016, Egypt received three more Rafales. All six aircraft are two-seat models (Rafale DM) diverted from French Air Force deliveries. Egypt received the third batch of three Rafales flown by Egyptian pilots from France in April 2017; this was included the first single-seat model (Rafale EM) to be delivered to the Egyptian Air Force. Egypt took delivery of the fourth batch of two Rafale EMs in July 2017. The fifth batch, comprising the last 3 Rafale EMs, was delivered in November 2017, increasing the number in service to 14 Rafales.

In June 2016, Egypt begun negotiations with Dassault to acquire 12 additional Rafales, intending to exercise an option of the first contract. An Egyptian delegation visited France in November 2017 for negotiations. In May 2021, Egypt ordered 30 more Rafales in a contract worth $4.5bn. On 15 November 2021, Egypt confirmed that it will receive 30 Rafale F3R between 2024 and 2026. The Egyptian Air Force is interested in buying the Rafale F4 variant once Dassault prepares it for foreign buyers.

Analysts view the relatively quick series of 84 orders from Egypt and Qatar as being influenced by the Arab Spring and uncertainty of US involvement in the Middle East.

Qatar

The Qatar Emiri Air Force evaluated the Rafale alongside the Boeing F/A-18E/F Super Hornet, the Boeing F-15E, the Eurofighter Typhoon, and the Lockheed Martin F-35 Lightning II to replace its Dassault Mirage 2000-5 fleet. In June 2014, Dassault claimed it was close to signing a contract with Qatar for 72 Rafales. On 30 April 2015, Sheikh Tamim bin Hamad Al Thani announced to French President François Hollande that Qatar would order 24 Rafale with an option to buy 12 more aircraft. On 4 May, a €6.3 billion ($7.02 billion) contract for 24 Rafales was finalised; additionally, the contract included the provision of long-range cruise missiles and Meteor missiles as well as the training of 36 Qatari pilots and 100 technicians by the French military and several Qatari intelligence officers; thus, the price can be viewed as €M for each aircraft.

On 7 December 2017, the option for 12 more Rafales was exercised for €1.1 billion (or €M each) while adding an additional option for 36 further fighters. The first Qatari Rafale was delivered in February 2019.

India

The Rafale was one of the six aircraft competing in the Indian MRCA competition for 126 multirole fighters. Originally, the Mirage 2000 had been considered for the competition, but Dassault withdrew it in favour of the Rafale. In February 2011, French Rafales flew demonstrations in India, including air-to-air combat against Su-30MKIs. In April 2011, the Indian Air Force (IAF) shortlisted the Rafale and Eurofighter Typhoon for the US$10.4 billion contract. On 31 January 2012, the IAF announced the Rafale as the preferred bidder. It was proposed that 18 Rafales would be supplied to the IAF by 2015 in fly-away condition, while the remaining 108 would be manufactured by Hindustan Aeronautics Limited (HAL) in India under transfer of technology agreements. The contract for 126 Rafales, services, and parts may have been worth up to US$20 billion.

The deal stalled due to disagreements over local production; Dassault refused responsibility for the 108 HAL-manufactured Rafales, holding reservations over HAL's ability to accommodate the complex manufacturing and technology transfers; instead, Dassault said it would have to negotiate two separate production contracts by both companies. The Indian Defence Ministry instead wanted Dassault to be solely responsible for the sale and delivery of all 126 aircraft. In May 2013, The Times of India reported that negotiations were "back on track", with plans for the first 18 Rafales to be delivered in 2017. In March 2014, the two sides reportedly agreed that the first 18 Rafales would be delivered to India in flying condition and that the remaining 108 would be 70 percent built by HAL. By December 2014, India and France reportedly expected to sign a contract by March 2015.

In April 2015, during Prime Minister Narendra Modi's visit to Paris, India requested the swift delivery of 36 Rafales in a fly-away condition. Indian Defence Minister Manohar Parrikar called for induction within two years. India withdrew the MMRCA tender on 30 July 2015. Then, India and France missed a July target to finalise the 36-aircraft deal. The previously agreed-upon terms in April totaled US$8 billion for 36 aircraft costing $200 million each, with an offset requirement of 30 percent of the deal's value to be reinvested in India's defence sector and infrastructure for Rafale operations. India insisted on a 50 percent offset and two bases, which France said would increase costs and require separate infrastructure and two sets of maintenance, training and armament storage facilities. In January 2016, the Indian government directed the Indian Navy to be briefed by Dassault on the navalised Rafale for its aircraft carriers, promoting logistics and spares commonalities between the Navy and IAF. Dassault CEO Eric Trappier stated that the Indian Navy may order up to 57 Rafales. On 23 September 2016, Defence Minister Parrikar and his French counterpart Jean-Yves Le Drian signed a €7.8 billion contract for 36 fly-away Rafales with an option for 18 more at the same inflation-adjusted price. Initial deliveries were expected by 2019, and all 36 within six years. The deal included spares and weapons such as Meteor missiles.

The Indian National Congress raised an issue over Dassault partnering with Anil Ambani's Reliance Defence, now known as Reliance Naval and Engineering Limited (R-Naval), a private company with no aviation experience, instead of the state owned HAL. Allegedly, Dassault lacked any choice and was compelled to select Reliance Defence as its partner. Rahul Gandhi alleged that it was favouritism and corruption. Both the French government and Dassault issued a press release stating it was Dassault's decision to choose Reliance Defence. Party spokesperson Manish Tewari asked for the agreement's details to be made public and questioned if there was an escalation of per-aircraft cost from ₹7.15 billion to ₹16 billion. In November 2018, Congress alleged that procurement procedures were bypassed. A Public Interest Litigation (PIL) case was filed in the Supreme Court for an independent probe into the Rafale procurement.

Around August 2017, India considered ordering 36 more Rafales amid tensions with China. In 2018, the Rafale was reportedly competing against several other aircraft in a new procurement tender for 114 multi-role combat aircraft, which is referred as MMRCA 2.0 in the Indian media. In March 2019, Indian officials asked for Rafales to replace ageing MiG-21s and to counter Pakistan's F-16s.

Ahead of the first Rafale's formal handover on 8 October 2019, IAF Day, the IAF accepted it at Dassault's Bordeaux facility in an event attended by Defence Minister Rajnath Singh and his French counterpart, Florence Parly; it had tail number "RB-001" to mark IAF chief-designate Air Chief Marshal R. K. S. Bhadauria's role in the buy. Rafale deliveries started on 27 July 2020, with the first five Rafales delivered from France.

By July 2021, a total of 26 Rafales had been received. Three Rafales were handed to the IAF in France on 25 January 2022 and arrived in India on 15 February 2022; these included Indian specific enhancements like the long range Meteor air-to-air missile, low band frequency jammers, advanced communication systems, more capable radio altimeter, radar warning receiver, high altitude engine start up, synthetic aperture radar, ground moving target indicator and tracking, missile approach warning systems and very high frequency range decoys. Once tested and verified, the remaining 32 Rafales would be retrofitting these enhancements, the IAF having all related equipment. The last Rafale arrived in April 2022. There has also been interest from the IAF and Navy to procure more Rafales.

Greece

In August 2020, the government of Greece announced the acquisition of 18 Rafales. Initial reports stated that ten would be the new Rafale C variant in F3-R standard with eight older Rafale in F1 and F2 standard in use with the French Air Force that would be given to Greece. However, later reports stated that all 18 would be F3-R standard and would replace an equal number of older Mirage 2000EGMs operated by the Hellenic Air Force.

In January 2021, the agreement with Dassault was ratified in the Hellenic Parliament for the purchase of six new built and 12 used F3-R aircraft formerly used by the Armée de l'Air at a total cost of €2.4 billion, including armaments and ground support. The inter-governmental agreement was signed on 25 January 2021 by the Defense Ministers of Greece and France. In April 2021, Greece was reportedly considering acquiring six more Rafales. The first aircraft, a Rafale B two-seater, was delivered on 21 July 2021. On 11 September 2021, Prime Minister Kyriakos Mitsotakis at the 2021 Thessaloniki International Fair announced the purchase of six additional Rafales, increasing the order total to 24. On 24 March 2022, Greece signed the contract to buy the six additional Rafales, to be delivered from mid-2024. On 19 January 2022, the first six Rafales landed at Tanagra Air Base where a welcoming ceremony was held.

Future operators

Croatia
Croatia received a proposal for 12 second-hand Rafales F3Rs in September 2020 for a tender to replace the Croatian Air Force's MiG-21s. The total package offered costs €1 billion (including weapon systems, spare parts, logistics and training), and competed with new F-16V Block 70, Israeli used F-16C/D Barak raised to ACE configuration, and Saab Gripen. On 28 May 2021, Croatian Prime Minister Andrej Plenković announced the purchase of 12 used Rafale F3Rs. The contract was signed on 25 November 2021.

Indonesia
In January 2020, the Indonesian government expressed interest in buying up to 48 Rafales to modernise the Indonesian Air Force. In February 2021, Indonesia's Minister of Defense Prabowo Subianto announced that the purchase of 36 units, as part of a large procurement programme including A330 tankers and complementary American products, was planned and that funds had been secured for its finalization. On 7 June 2021, Indonesia signed a letter of intent to buy 36 Rafales and associated weapons and support.

On 20 January 2022, Indonesia's Minister of Defense Prabowo Subianto confirmed that Indonesia completed the negotiation of the contract pending activation of the formal agreement by France. On 10 February 2022, Dassault stated that Indonesia had officially signed an order for 42 Rafale F4, concluding two years of negotiations with six Batch 1 aircraft, consisting of 30 single-seat and 12 double-seat.

United Arab Emirates
In 2009, the United Arab Emirates Air Force was interested in an upgraded Rafale with more powerful engines and radar, and advanced air-to-air missiles. In October 2011, Dassault was confident that a US$10 billion deal for up to 60 Rafales would be signed. However, Deputy Supreme Commander of the Union Defence Force, Mohammed bin Zayed Al Nahyan, in November 2011 called the French offer "uncompetitive and unworkable"; In 2010, France allegedly asked the UAE to pay US$2.6 billion of the total cost of Rafale upgrades. Consequently, the UAE explored a purchase of the Eurofighter Typhoon or the F/A-18E/F Super Hornet. The newspaper La Tribune reported in February 2012, that the UAE was still considering the US$10-billion deal for 60 Rafales. Interoperability among the Gulf air forces had renewed Qatari and Kuwaiti interest in the Rafale. In January 2013, President Hollande stated that he would discuss the Rafale during an official visit to the UAE. In December 2013, the UAE reportedly chose not to proceed with a deal for defence and security services, including the supply of Typhoons.

In September 2014, it was reported that the UAE could acquire 40 Rafales in addition to upgrading its existing Mirage 2000s. In November 2015, Reuters reported that Major General Ibrahim Nasser Al Alawi, commander of the UAE Air Force and Air Defence, had confirmed that the UAE was in final negotiations to purchase 60 Rafales. In 2019 a series of Rafale F3-R trials were conducted at Al Dhafra Air Base in the UAE. On 3 December 2021, Dassault announced that the UAE had signed an order for 80 Rafale F4 in a government-to-government deal, which made the UAE the largest Rafale operator in the region and second to France. The deal makes the United Arab Emirates Air Force the first user of the Rafale F4 standard outside France.

Potential operators

Bangladesh 
In March 2020, La Tribune reported that France's Minister of the Armed Forces, Florence Parly, promoted the Rafale's performance to Bangladeshi Prime Minister Sheikh Hasina, who is also Minister of Defense.

Colombia 
In June 2022, La Tribune reported Dassault made an offer for 15 fighters and 9 in option for the Colombian Air Force. Colombia was interested in used ones, but France denied, taking into consideration it already sold 24 jets to Croatia and Greece. On December 21 2022, the Colombian government announced that they had shortlisted the Rafale for a potential 16 aircraft order to replace their aging Kfir.

Iraq
In November 2020, Iraqi Defence Minister Jumaa Adnan stated that Iraq plans to buy Rafales for the Iraqi Air Force. In February 2022, Iraq reportedly intends to acquire 14 Rafale F4s, payable in crude oil.

Malaysia
The Rafale was a contender for the replacement of the Royal Malaysian Air Force's (RMAF) Mikoyan MiG-29s, with a requirement to equip three squadrons with 36 to 40 fighters with an estimated budget of RM6 billion to RM8 billion (US$1.84 billion to US$2.46 billion). Other competitors were the Eurofighter Typhoon, Boeing F/A-18/F Super Hornet and Saab JAS 39 Gripen. In July 2017, acquisition efforts were suspended with the RMAF looking instead to buy new maritime patrol aircraft and advanced trainers with light attack capabilities to confront the growing threat of Islamist militants in the Southeast Asian region.

Saudi Arabia
In February 2022, La Tribune reported that Saudi Arabia is interested in the Rafale, then reported in December 2022 that Saudi Arabia would need between 100 and 200 fighters.

Serbia 
The President of Serbia, Aleksandar Vučić, stated on 24 December 2021 that Serbia is interested in buying new Rafales to strengthen the Serbian Air Force and Air Defence. La Tribune reported in April 2022 that Serbia and Dassault are negotiating for 12 Rafales.

Ukraine 
In April 2021, according to the Asia Times report, Ukraine is seeking to purchase 36 to 42 Rafale fighters to replace the MiG-29 and Su-27 models it has used since the former Soviet era. 

In January 2023, according to the Asia Times report, the war between Russia and Ukraine continued, and European and American countries are also preparing intensively for assistance to Ukraine's air power. France stated that it does not rule out providing the Rafale fighters to Ukraine.

Failed bids
The Rafale has been marketed for export to various countries. Various commentators and industry sources have highlighted the high cost of the aircraft as detrimental to the Rafale's sales prospects. Its acquisition cost is roughly US$100 million (2010), while its operational cost hovers around US$16,500 (2012) for every flight-hour. The Saab JAS Gripen, in comparison, costs only US$4,700 per flight-hour to operate. According to a 2009 article by the Institute for Defense Studies and Analysis, unlike the American government and its relationship with Boeing and Lockheed Martin, the lack of communication between the French government and Dassault has hampered a worldwide cooperative sales effort, as demonstrated by the case with Morocco in 2007.

Belgium

In 2009, Belgium suggested that they may buy F-35s in the 2020s to replace Belgium's 34 F-16A/B MLU fleet. An article published in Belgian newspaper L'Avenir on 19 April 2015 speculated that, if the nuclear strike role via Belgium's Nuclear sharing policy were retained in the request for proposals, Belgium would be almost forced to buy the F-35 as to maintain this role. Belgium officially launched its F-16 replacement program in March 2017, issuing requests for proposals to three European and two US manufacturers: Boeing Defense, Space & Security, Lockheed Martin, Dassault, Eurofighter GmbH and Saab Group, offering the F/A-18E/F Super Hornet, F-35 Lightning II, Rafale, Eurofighter Typhoon and Saab JAS 39 Gripen respectively. On 25 October 2018, Belgium officially selected the offer for 34 F-35As; government officials stated that it had come down to price, and that "The offer from the Americans was the best in all seven evaluation criteria". The total purchasing price for the aircraft and support until 2030 totaled €4 billion, €600 million cheaper than the budgeted €4.6 billion. In April 2020, the first F-35 contract was signed, with deliveries to begin in 2023.

Brazil

In June 2008, the Brazilian Air Force issued a request for information on the following aircraft: F/A-18E/F Super Hornet, F-16 Fighting Falcon, Rafale, Su-35, Gripen NG and Eurofighter Typhoon. In October 2008, the service selected three finalists for F-X2 – Dassault Rafale, Gripen NG and Boeing F/A-18E/F. On 5 January 2010, media reports stated that the final evaluation report by the Brazilian Air Force placed the Gripen ahead of the other two contenders based on unit and operating costs. In February 2011, Brazilian President Dilma Rousseff had reportedly decided in favour of the F/A-18. After delays due to budget constraints, in December 2013, the Brazilian government selected the Gripen NG in a US$5 billion deal to equip the air force.

Canada

The Rafale was amongst various fighters proposed to replace the Royal Canadian Air Force's McDonnell Douglas CF-18 Hornet. In 2005, a report compiled by Canada's Department of Defence reviewing aircraft noted concerns over the Rafale's interoperability with US forces; Dassault had also been unable to confirm engine performance during cold weather conditions. In July 2010, the Canadian government announced the F-35 as the CF-18's replacement; the nation was already a partner in the Joint Strike Fighter program since 1997 and a Tier 3 partner for the F-35 since 2002. In December 2012, the Canadian government announced that the F-35 buy had been abandoned due to cost rises and that a fresh procurement process would begin. In January 2013, Dassault responded to Canada's request for information. Various aircraft were considered, including the F-35. In January 2014, Dassault offered a contract with full technology transfer, allowing Canada to perform its own support and upgrades, thereby lowering long-term service costs. In November 2018, Dassault withdrew from the competition, reportedly over interoperability and intelligence sharing requirements, particularly with the US, complicated by France's lack of involvement in the Five Eyes intelligence-sharing group.

Finland

In June 2015, a working group set up by the Finnish MoD proposed starting the HX Fighter Program to replace the Finnish Air Force's current fleet of F/A-18 Hornets. The group recognises five potential types: Boeing F/A-18E/F Super Hornet, Dassault Rafale, Eurofighter Typhoon, Lockheed Martin F-35 Lightning II and Saab JAS 39 Gripen E/F. In December 2015, the Finnish MoD informed Great Britain, France, Sweden and the US informing them of the launch of the HX Fighter Program to replace the Hornet fleet, which will be decommissioned by 2025, with multi-role fighters; the Rafale is mentioned as a potential fighter. The request for information was sent in early 2016; five responses were received in November 2016. In December 2021, the Finnish newspaper Iltalehti reported that several foreign and security policy sources had confirmed the Finnish Defense Forces' recommendation of the F-35 as Finland's next fighter due to its "capability and expected long lifespan".

Kuwait
In February 2009, French President Nicolas Sarkozy announced that Kuwait was considering buying up to 28 Rafales. In October 2009, during a visit to Paris, the Kuwaiti Defence Minister expressed interest in the Rafale and said that he was awaiting Dassault's terms. Islamist lawmakers in the Kuwaiti national assembly threatened to block such a purchase, accusing the Defence Minister of lack of transparency and being manipulated by business interests. In January 2012, the French Defence Minister said that both Kuwait and Qatar were waiting to see if the UAE first purchased the Rafale and that Kuwait would look to buy 18–22 Rafales. However, on 11 September 2015, Eurofighter announced that an agreement had been reached with Kuwait to buy 28 Typhoons.

Singapore

In 2005, the Republic of Singapore Air Force launched its Next Generation Fighter (NGF) programme to replace its ageing A-4SU Super Skyhawks. Several options were considered and the Defence Science & Technology Agency (DSTA) conducted a detailed technical assessment, simulations and other tests to determine the final selection. This reduced the list of competitors to the Rafale and the F-15SG Strike Eagle. In December 2005, Singapore ordered 12 F-15SGs. According to Defense Industry Daily, key reasons for the selection were that, despite the Rafale's superior aerodynamics, it had insufficient range, weapons, and sensor integration.

Switzerland

In February 2007, Switzerland was reportedly considering the Rafale and other fighters to replace its ageing Northrop F-5 Tiger IIs. A one-month evaluation started in October 2008 at Emmen Airforce Base, consisting of approximately 30 evaluation flights; the Rafale, along with the JAS 39 Gripen and the Typhoon, were evaluated. Although a leaked Swiss Air Force evaluation report revealed that the Rafale won the competition on technical grounds, on 30 November 2011, the Swiss Federal Council announced plans to buy 22 Gripen NGs due to its lower acquisition and maintenance costs. Due to a referendum, this purchase never happened.

In March 2018, Swiss officials named contenders in its Air 2030 program: The Rafale, Saab Gripen, Eurofighter Typhoon, Boeing F/A-18E/F Super Hornet and Lockheed Martin F-35. In October 2018, the Swiss Air Force was reportedly limited to buying a single-engine fighter for budgetary reasons. In May 2019, the Rafale performed demonstration flights at Payerne Air Base for comparison against other bids. On 30 June 2021, the Swiss Federal Council proposed to Parliament the acquisition of 36 F-35As at a cost of up to 6 billion Swiss francs (US$6.5 billion), citing the aircraft's cost- and combat-effectiveness. However, it was later confirmed that the costs are capped for a period of just 10 years. The Liberal Greens have promised to examine the F-35's environmental impact. The Swiss anti-military group GSoA intended to contest the purchase in another national referendum supported by the Green Party of Switzerland and the Social Democratic Party of Switzerland (which previously managed to block the Gripen). In August 2022, they registered the initiative, with 120,000 people having signed in less than a year (with 100,000 required).

On 15 September 2022 the Swiss National council gave the Federal council permission to sign the purchase deal, with a time limit for signing of March 2023. The deal to buy 36 F-35A was signed on 19 September 2022, with deliveries to commence in 2027 and conclude by 2030, bypassing the popular initiative.

Other bids
In 2002, the Republic of Korea Air Force chose the F-15K Slam Eagle over the Dassault Rafale, Eurofighter Typhoon and Sukhoi Su-35 for its 40 aircraft F-X Phase 1 fighter competition.

In January 2007, the French newspaper Journal du Dimanche reported that Libya sought 13 to 18 Rafales "in a deal worth as much as US$3.24 billion". In December 2007, Saif al-Islam Gaddafi declared Libya's interest in the Rafale, but no order was placed. French Rafales later attacked targets in Libya as part of the international military intervention during the 2011 Libyan civil war.

In late 2007, La Tribune reported that a prospective US$2.85 billion sale to Morocco had fallen through, the government selecting the F-16C/D instead. While French Defense Minister Hervé Morin labelled it as overly sophisticated and too costly, defense analysists have said that miscalculations of the DGA's offer price and hesitations over financing were detrimental to the negotiations.

In February 2009, France offered Rafales to Oman to replace its ageing fleet of SEPECAT Jaguars. In December 2012, Oman placed an order for 12 Typhoons.

Variants

Rafale A Technology demonstrator, first flew in 1986.
Rafale D Dassault used this designation (D for discrète) in the early 1990s to emphasise the new semi-stealthy design features.
Rafale B variant F3-R Two-seater version for the French Air Force. "It can operate with the Talios targeting pod (45 ordered by the French Air Force will be delivered between 2019 and 2023)."
Rafale C variant F3-R Same as Rafale B F3-R but single-seat version for the French Air Force.
Rafale M variant F3-R Same as Rafale C F3-R but carrier-borne version for the French Naval Aviation, which entered service in 2001. For carrier operations, the M model has a strengthened airframe, longer nose gear leg to provide a more nose-up attitude, larger tailhook between the engines, and a built-in boarding ladder. Consequently, the Rafale M weighs about  more than the Rafale C. It is the only non-US fighter type cleared to operate from the decks of US carriers, using catapults and their arresting gear, as demonstrated in 2008 when six Rafales from Flottille 12F integrated into the  Carrier Air Wing interoperability exercise.
 All 180 French Rafale B, C, and M models will be upgraded to variant F4.1 in 2022 and F4.2 in 2027. These variants were ordered in 2019, moreover a further 30 aircraft at the full F4 standard (F4.2) will be ordered in 2023 and delivered between 2027 and 2030. Rafale B, C, M will be upgraded to Block F4 (first step 4.1, second step 4.2) This variant will have upgraded radar (F4.1), as well as improved capabilities in the Helmet-Mounted Display and AASM 1000 kg. The OSF (long-range optoelectronics system) will add IRST (Infrared Search and Track) for detecting and identifying airborne stealth targets at long range (F4.1). It will be more effective in network-centric warfare, with more data exchange and satellite communication capacity and will launch small (F4.2). French navy have conducted the first test campaign with Rafale F4-1 standard from 26 to 29 April 2021. and the first deck landing on the Carrier vessel Nuclear Charles de Gaulle on 9 December 2021
Rafale N Originally called the Rafale BM, was a planned missile-only two-seater version for the Aéronavale. Budgetary and technical constraints have been cited as grounds for its cancellation.
Rafale R Proposed reconnaissance-oriented variant.
Rafale DM Two-seater version for the Egyptian Air Force.
Rafale EM Single-seat version for the Egyptian Air Force.
Rafale DH Two-seater version for the Indian Air Force.
Rafale EH Single-seat version for the Indian Air Force.
Rafale DQ Two-seater version for the Qatar Emiri Air Force.
Rafale EQ Single-seat version for the Qatar Emiri Air Force.

Operators

	
 Croatian Air Force – 12 C/B F3-R Rafales on order, 10 C F3-R and 2 B F3-R. The first 8 will be delivered in 2024 and the remaining 4 in 2025.

 Egyptian Air Force – 54 ordered with 24 Rafales in service .
 A total of 180 have been ordered out of a planned 286, with an option for another 9. Approximately 152 are confirmed to be delivered by 2018. , 149 had been delivered. In 2018 three Rafale will be delivered, and then in 2024 all the 28 remaining out of the 180 ordered will be delivered.
 French Air and Space Force – 102; flying units include:
 Saint-Dizier – Robinson Air Base
 Escadron de Chasse 2/4 La Fayette (2018–present) nuclear strike
 Escadron de Chasse 1/7 Provence (2006–2016) multirole fighter
 Escadron de Chasse 1/4 Gascogne (2009–present) nuclear strike
 Escadron de Transformation Rafale 3/4 Aquitaine (October 2010–present, Rafale Operational Conversion Unit (OCU) jointly operated by French Air Force and French naval Aviation)
 Mont-de-Marsan Air Base
 Escadron de Chasse 2/30 Normandie-Niemen (2012–present) multirole fighter
 Escadron de Chasse 3/30 Lorraine (2016–present) multirole fighter
 Escadron de chasse et d'expérimentation 1/30 Côte d'Argent (2004–present) tactics development and evaluation
 Al Dhafra Air Base, UAE
 Escadron de Chasse 3/30 Lorraine (2010–2016) multirole fighter
 Escadron de Chasse 1/7 Provence (2016–present) multirole fighter
 French Navy – 46 delivered, 41 active
 Naval Air Base Landivisiau
 Flottille 11F (2011–present) multirole carrier fighter
 Flottille 12F (2001–present) multirole carrier fighter
 Flottille 17F (2016–present) multirole carrier fighter

 Hellenic Air Force – Greece ordered 18 Rafales in 2020, and an additional six in 2021, bringing the total order number to 24. The first was delivered on 21 July 2021. A total of 10 have been delivered to the Hellenic Air Force as of December 2022.
 Tanagra Air Base
 332nd All Weather Squadron (Hawks)

 Indian Air Force – 36 (28 single-seat and 8 dual-seat) aircraft ordered. with 2 kept for training missions in France. By July 2022, all 36 Rafales had been delivered.
Ambala AFS
 No. 17 Squadron (Golden Arrows)
 Hasimara AFS
 No. 101 Squadron (Falcons)

 Indonesian Air Force – 42 aircraft on order.

 Qatar Emiri Air Force – 36 ordered, 27 delivered. Qatar ordered 24 of the fighters in 2015, and ordered 12 more in 2018. It also has an option to order 36 more. , 27 were delivered.
 Dukhan / Tamim Airbase
 1st Fighter Squadron 'Al Adiyat'

 United Arab Emirates Air Force – 80 Rafale F4s on order

Notable accidents
 On 6 December 2007, a French Air Force twin-seat Rafale crashed during a training flight. The pilot, who suffered from spatial disorientation, died in the accident.
One test pilot, identified as François Duflot, died in the accident, while the other was rescued.
 On 28 November 2010, a Rafale from the carrier Charles de Gaulle crashed in the Arabian Sea. This aircraft was supporting Allied operations in Afghanistan. The pilot ejected safely and was rescued by a rescue helicopter from the carrier. Later reports said the engines stopped after being starved of fuel due to confusion by the pilot in switching fuel tanks.
 On 2 July 2012, during a joint exercise, a Rafale from the carrier Charles de Gaulle plunged into the Mediterranean Sea. The pilot ejected safely and was recovered by an American search and rescue helicopter from the carrier .

Specifications

See also

Notes

References

Bibliography

External links

 
 

Rafale
Canard aircraft
Carrier-based aircraft
Delta-wing aircraft
1980s French fighter aircraft
Twinjets
Relaxed-stability aircraft
Aircraft first flown in 1986